Aljaž Bedene was the defending champion but chose not to participate.

Elias Ymer won the title, defeating Adam Pavlásek 7–5, 6–4 in the final.

Seeds

Draw

Finals

Top half

Bottom half

References
Main Draw
Qualifying Draw

Open Citta Della Disfida - Singles
2016 Singles